was a Japanese football player. He played for Japan national team.

Club career
Sugimoto was born in Kobe on December 4, 1926. After graduating from Kwansei Gakuin University, he joined Hankyu Railways in 1948. He also played for Kwangaku Club was consisted of his alma mater Kwansei Gakuin University players and graduates. At the club, he won 1950, 1953 and 1955 Emperor's Cup.

National team career
In March 1951, Sugimoto was selected Japan national team for Japan team first game after World War II, 1951 Asian Games. At this competition, on March 7, he debuted against Iran. He played 3 games for Japan until 1954.

On April 2, 2002, Sugimoto died of kidney failure in Nishinomiya at the age of 75.

National team statistics

Honours
Japan
Asian Games Bronze medal: 1951

References

External links
 
 Japan National Football Team Database

1926 births
2002 deaths
Kwansei Gakuin University alumni
Association football people from Hyōgo Prefecture
Japanese footballers
Japan international footballers
Asian Games medalists in football
Asian Games bronze medalists for Japan
Footballers at the 1951 Asian Games
Medalists at the 1951 Asian Games
Association football midfielders